Joseph Kwame Addison, popularly known as KillBeatz, is a Ghanaian music producer and sound engineer. He is a member of music group R2bees and is also the CEO of Legacy Life Entertainment, which has signed the Ghanaian musician King Promise.

Life and career 
KillBeatz started playing instruments for his church before he ventured into secular music. He started as a rapper and later switched to music production. He got the name KillBeatz from Ghanaian rapper Omar Sterling (Paedae) of R2Bees. He was helped by Ghanaian music producer Kaywa at the early stage of his career. He has worked with artists like Sarkodie, Efya, R2Bees, Wizkid, Ed Sheeran, and Fuse ODG, among others. The various genres of music he produces for include highlife, hiplife, Azonto and Afrobeats.  In 2012, KillBeatz contributed heavily to the Azonto music genre by producing beats for a lot of Azonto songs during its prime.

Killbeatz won Producer of the Year at the Vodafone Ghana Music Awards (VGMA) in 2013, 2014, and 2018. He received production credit on a song titled "Bibia Be Ye Ye" by British singer Ed Sheeran featuring UK-based Ghanaian artiste Fuse ODG. The song was part of Ed Sheeran’s ÷ ("Divide") album, which won Best Pop Vocal Album at the 60th Grammy Awards in 2018.

Discography

Songs recorded

References

Living people
Year of birth missing (living people)